Alsisar is a small town in the north-western part of Jhunjhunu district, Rajasthan, India. The area surrounding the town is an arid semi desert. This place is known for its temperature ranging from 48 °C in summer to below zero levels in winter.

Like other places in Shekhawati, Alsisar is famous for its castle, havelis and cenotaphs.

Geography
Alsisar is 22 km from Jhunjhunu District and 194 km from Jaipur.

Magnetic Fields Music Festival

Magnetic Fields Music Festival is hosted in the Alsisar Palace, and sees various musicians from around the world perform, with attendees camping in the desert.

Places of interest 
Satya Narayan ji ka temple 
Shri Rani Sati ji ka temple 
Alsisar Mahal (Alsisar Fort) 
Kataruka ki haveli.
Shri Lal Bahadur Mal ki haveli 
Tejpal Jhunjhunuwala ki haveli 
Ramjas Jhunjhunuwala ki haveli 
Lakha ka ki haveli 
Mahali Dutt khaitan haveli 
Jode ka Balaji Mandir
Bus Stand Park
Arjun Ram khetan haveli 
Cenotaph of Thakur Chhotu Singh 
Satya Narain temple 
Poonia haveli 
Panchayat Samiti 
Alsisar Gate 
Gopinathji Temple 
Chouk vale Balaji Mandir 
Mataji temple 
Chauhano ki haveli 
Shyam baba ka mandir 
Jujhar ji ka mandir

References

www.vellapanti.net/index.php/incredible-rajasthan/

Cities and towns in Jhunjhunu district